William O'Neill (30 August 1876 – 24 April 1963) was an Irish hurler and Gaelic footballer who played for Cork Championship clubs William O'Brien's and Sarsfields. He was also a member of the Cork senior teams as a dual player for over a decade during which time he usually lined out as a forward.

Honours

Cork
All-Ireland Senior Hurling Championship (2): 1902, 1903
Munster Senior Hurling Championship (4): 1902, 1903, 1904, 1905
Munster Senior Football Championship (2): 1899, 1901

References

1876 births
1963 deaths
Sarsfields (Cork) hurlers
Cork inter-county hurlers
Cork inter-county Gaelic footballers
All-Ireland Senior Hurling Championship winners
Dual players
Irish farmers